Judaism in North America includes:

 Judaism in Canada
 Judaism in Mexico
 Judaism in the United States
 Judaism in Greenland
 Judaism in Central America
 Judaism in the Caribbean

See also 
 Index of Jewish history–related articles

Judaism by country
Judaism in North America